Ernest Coleman may refer to:

Bert Coleman (1889–1958), English footballer, played for England and Dulwich Hamlet
Ernie Coleman (1908–1984), English footballer, played for Grimsby Town, Arsenal and Middlesbrough